The 1951 season of the Primera División Peruana, the top category of Peruvian football, was played by 10 teams. The national champions were Sport Boys.

Results

Standings

External links 
 Peru 1951 season at RSSSF
 Peruvian Football League News 

Peru1
1951 in Peruvian football
Peruvian Primera División seasons